Mary Jeanne van Appledorn (October 2, 1927 in Holland, Michigan – December 12, 2014 in Lubbock, Texas) was an American composer of contemporary classical music and pianist.

Education and career 
Van Appledorn attended the Eastman School of Music in Rochester, New York, where she studied piano and theory with Bernard Rogers and Alan Hovhaness. She received her Bachelor of Music in 1948, her Masters of Music in 1950, and her Ph.D. in music theory from Eastman in 1966. She also completed post-doctoral studies in computer-synthesized sound at MIT in 1982. She was a member of the music faculty of Texas Tech University from 1950 until 2008. She was the Paul Whitfield Horn Professor of Music from 1989 to 2000.

She composed numerous works for various instrumental combinations and also composed computer music. She had work commissioned by the Music Teachers National Association and National Intercollegiate Bands.

Her surname is Dutch (from the town of Apeldoorn, though in Americanized spelling); her great-grandparents emigrated to the United States from the Netherlands. She visited Apeldoorn in 1982.

Musical style 
Her works are generally tonal, although she also used the twelve-tone technique, and she frequently utilized string piano techniques in her piano music. Her music has been recorded by the Opus One and Golden Crest labels, and her scores are published by numerous publishers.

Awards and honors 

 Premier Prix
 Dijon
 Texas Composors Guild
 ASCAP Standard Panel Awards

Selected works

Orchestral 

 Concerto brevis, pf  (orch) (1954)
 A Choreographic Ov. (band) (1957)
 Conc. (trumpet) (1960)
 Passacaglia and Chorale (1973)
 Lux 'Legend of Sankta Lucia''' (band, hp, perc, handbells) (1981)
 Terrestrial Music (vn, pf, str) (1992)
 Cycles of Moon and Tides (band) (1995)
 Rhapsody (vn, orch) (1996)
 Music of Enchantment (Amerindian fl, str, perc) (1997)

 Chamber and solo  

 Cellano Rhapsody (vc) (1948)
 Burlesca (brass, perc, pf) (1951)
 Patterns (5 hn) (1956)
 Matrices (sax, pf) (1979)
 Cacophony (wind, perc, toys) (1980)
 Liquid Gold (sax, pf) (1982)
 4 Duos (2 a sax) (1985) 
 4 Duos (va, vc) (1986)
 Sonic Mutation (hp) (1987)
 Cornucopia (tpt) (1988) 
 Sonatina (cl, pf) (1988)
 Ayre (cl/sav ens, viol ens, str) (1989)
 Three for Two (2 rec/fl) (1989)
 Windsongs (brass qnt) (1991)
 Incantations (tpt, pf) (1992)
 Atmosphere (trbn ens) (1993)
 Postcards to John (gui) (1993)
 Rhapsody (tpt, hp) (1993)
 Reeds Afire (cl, bn) (1994)
 Sound the Tpt! (tpt, org) (1994)
 Trio Italiano (tpt, hn, b trbn) (1995)
 Passages (trbn, pf) (1996)
 A Native American Mosaic (Amerindian fl) (1997)
 Incantations (ob, pf) (1998)
 Passages II (trbn, perc) (1998)
 Miniatures, for trombone quartet (2002)

 Piano 

 Contrasts (pf) (1947)
 Set of Five (pf) (1953)
 Sonnet (org) (1959)
 3 Pf Pieces (1972)
 6 Pf Pieces (1972)
 Scenes from Pecos Country  (pf) (1972)
 Elegy for Pepe (pf) (1982)
 A Liszt Fantasie (pf) (1984)
 Freedom of Youth (spkr, synth) (1986)
 Set of Seven (dance score) (pf) (1988)
 Parquet musique (hpd) (1990)
 Variations on Jerusalem the Golden (org) (1996)

 CarillonSuite (1976)A Celestial Clockwork (1983)Caprice (1988)Tower Music (1990)
Skybells (1991)

 Vocal 

 Choral 

 Tears (1952)
 2 Shakespeare Songs (chorus, pf) (1953)
 Peter Quince at the Clavier (spkr, female vv, fl, ob, hn, pf) (1958)
 Darest Thou Nos, O Soul (female vv, org) (1975)
 West Texas Suite (chorus, band, perc) (1976)
 Rising Night After Night (spkr, S, T, Bar, 2 choruses, orch) (1978)
 Spirit Divine (chorus, org) (1986)
 Love Divine All Loves Excelling (SATB, org) (1988)
 Les hommes vidés (SATB) (1994)

 Solo 

 I Hear America Singing (W. Whitman) (1v, pf) (1952)
 Communiqué (1v, pf) (1960)
 Azaleas (Bar fl, pf) (1980)
 Missa brevis (1v, tpt, org) (1987)

 Publications 

 Keyboard, singing, and dictation manual'' (1968)

References

External links
Mary Jeanne van Appledorn page, from Texas Tech University site
Interview with Mary Jeanne van Appledorn, January 20, 1988

20th-century classical composers
21st-century classical composers
Texas classical music
American women classical composers
American classical composers
American people of Dutch descent
Eastman School of Music alumni
Texas Tech University faculty
1927 births
2014 deaths
People from Holland, Michigan
Pupils of Bernard Rogers
21st-century American composers
20th-century American women musicians
20th-century American musicians
20th-century American composers
21st-century American women musicians
Composers for carillon
20th-century women composers
21st-century women composers
American women academics